Grub Street is Towson University's arts and literary magazine. Published yearly, the magazine features the writings and artwork of Towson students and others in the community. The magazine is nationally recognized and has won many awards given by the Columbia Press Association. It is available free of charge at locations on the Towson University campus.

History and profile
Grub Street was founded in 1952. The magazine is named after "Grub Street", a former street in London's impoverished Moorfields district. In the 18th and 19th centuries, the street was famous for its concentration of mediocre, impoverished 'hack writers', aspiring poets, and low-end publishers and booksellers, who existed on the margins of the journalistic and literary scene. Grub Street's bohemian, impoverished literary scene was set amidst the poor neighborhood's low-rent flophouses, brothels, and coffeehouses.

The popular horror novelist Ronald Malfi had published some of his early stories in Grub Street while attending Towson University.

Mission
According to their website:

See also
List of literary magazines

References

External links
Grub Street website

1952 establishments in Maryland
Annual magazines published in the United States
Literary magazines published in the United States
Magazines established in 1952
Magazines published in Baltimore
Student magazines published in the United States
Towson University media outlets